Amílcar Vasconcellos (Artigas, 22 September 1915 - Montevideo, 22 October. 1999) was a Uruguayan politician, lawyer, government minister and Senator. In 1967 he challenged Óscar Diego Gestido to a duel. He was Minister of Economy and Finance from 1957 to 1958 and in 1967.

References 

Uruguayan people of Portuguese descent
People from Artigas Department
University of the Republic (Uruguay) alumni
20th-century Uruguayan lawyers
Colorado Party (Uruguay) politicians
Ministers of Economics and Finance of Uruguay
Ministers of Livestock, Agriculture, and Fisheries of Uruguay
National Council of Government (Uruguay)
1915 births
1999 deaths
Candidates for President of Uruguay